Hellemyrtoppen is a neighbourhood in the city of Kristiansand in Agder county, Norway. It is located in the borough of Grim and in the district of Hellemyr. Hellemyrtoppen is located just north of the European route E39 highway. It is north of Rige, east of Vestheiene, and west of Fjellro.

Transportation

References

Geography of Kristiansand
Neighbourhoods of Kristiansand